The 1949 All-Ireland Senior Camogie Championship Final was the eighteenth All-Ireland Final and the deciding match of the 1949 All-Ireland Senior Camogie Championship, an inter-county camogie tournament for the top teams in Ireland.

Dublin led 7-4 to 1-1 at half-time, and although Tipperary made a slight comeback, Dublin still won easily. Kathleen Cody scored 6-7 of Dublin's total.

References

All-Ireland Senior Camogie Championship Final
All-Ireland Senior Camogie Championship Final
All-Ireland Senior Camogie Championship Final, 1949
All-Ireland Senior Camogie Championship Finals
Dublin county camogie team matches
Tipperary county camogie team matches